Gone in the Night is a 1996 American television film about the Jaclyn Dowaliby murder case, with Shannen Doherty  and Kevin Dillon as Cynthia and David Dowaliby.

The Dowaliby Case 
On September 10, 1988, 7 year-old Jaclyn Dowaliby was kidnapped from her home in the middle of the night. Two years later in 1990, Cynthia and Jaclyn's adoptive father David Dowaliby went on trial for the murder of their daughter. Cynthia was acquitted by the judge on grounds of insufficient evidence, but David was tried and convicted of his daughter's death and sentenced to a total of 45 years in prison. His conviction came partly because the jury was shown photographs of a closet door, with fist holes in it. It was later proven that this damage happened before David even moved into the house.

In 1991, David's conviction was overturned when the Illinois Appellate Court reversed the conviction outright, holding that the evidence against him had been no more probative than that against his wife. The murder of Jaclyn remains unsolved.

Cast
Shannen Doherty as Cynthia "Cindi" Dowaliby
Kevin Dillon as David Dowaliby
Ed Asner as Detective John Waters 
Dixie Carter as Ann Dowaliby 
James Anthony as Detective Foley 
Jeanne Averill as Debbie Sanborn 
Michael Brandon as David Protess
Billy Burke as Rob Kinney 
Kevin Brief as Terry Summers 
Devon Arielle Cahill as Jaclyn Dowaliby 
Walter Coppage as Hugh Gordon 
Trina Creighton as Kristi Carter 
Ellen Dubin as Mary Ann Brown 
Brett Murray as Davey Dowaliby
Sarah Phipps a nurse extra

External links 

1996 television films
1996 films
1996 crime drama films
American crime drama films
CBS network films
Drama films based on actual events
Films about murder
Crime films based on actual events
Films directed by Bill L. Norton
American drama television films
1990s English-language films
1990s American films